Jack Meyers (sometimes spelled Meyer) is an American music promoter and former general manager of First Avenue & 7th St. Entry in Minneapolis, Minnesota.

Notes

Living people
20th-century American businesspeople
Year of birth missing (living people)